Posthumous may refer to:
 Posthumous award - an award, prize or medal granted after the recipient's death
 Posthumous publication – material published after the author's death
 Posthumous (album), by Warne Marsh, 1987
 Posthumous (EP), by The Banner, 2001
 Posthumous (film), a 2014 American-German romantic comedy

See also
 
 List of people known as the Posthumous
 Posthumus (surname)
 Postumus (disambiguation)